Nucleobindin-2 is a protein that when found in humans is encoded by the NUCB2 gene.

Nucleobindin-2 is a calcium-binding EF-hand protein.[supplied by OMIM]

NUCB2 is protein precursor of nesfatin-1

In the study of the evolution of nervous systems, NUCB2 together with SMIM20 have been found to have deep homology across all lineages that preceded creatures with central nervous systems, bilaterians, cnidarians, ctenophores, and sponges as well as in choanoflagellates.

Interactions 

NUCB2 has been shown to interact with NDN.

References

Further reading 

 
 
 
 
 
 
 
 

EF-hand-containing proteins